The 1950 Michigan Wolverines football team was an American football team that represented the University of Michigan in the 1950 Big Ten Conference football season. Coached by Bennie Oosterbaan, the Wolverines won the Big Ten Conference championship with a record of 6–3–1 (4–1–1 in conference) and defeated California in the 1951 Rose Bowl, 14–6. The team had two All-Big 10 backs in Don Dufek and Chuck Ortmann and All-American tackle R. Allen "Brick" Wahl.  Despite losing three times and tying once, Michigan was ranked No. 9 in the AP Poll and No. 6 in the UPI Poll at season's end. The Wolverines played a regular season game at Yankee Stadium against Army on October 14, 1950.  They lost that game 27–6.

Schedule

Season summary

Week 1: Michigan State

Michigan, ranked No. 3 in the country, opened the 1950 season playing against Michigan State College in Ann Arbor.  Though favored by two touchdowns, the Wolverines were upset by the Spartans 14-7.  The defeat was Michigan's first loss in the opening game of a season since 1937.  Michigan played most of the game without its leading player, Chuck Ortmann.  Ortmann was injured while being tackled on a 35-yard kickoff return in the first quarter.  On the next play, Ortmann dropped back to pass but fell to the ground and was unable to return to the game.  Michigan State took a 7-0 lead in the first quarter on a touchdown run by Sonny Grandelius.  Michigan tied the score in the third quarter on a touchdown pass from Don Peterson to Fred Pickard.  Michigan's touchdown was set up when Frank Howell intercepted a Michigan State pass and returned it 32 yards to the Michigan State 20-yard line.  In the fourth quarter, Michigan State returned a punt to the Michigan 19-yard line and scored on a run by Michigan State fullback Leroy Crane.  Michigan drove to the Michigan State 10-yard line in the fourth quarter, but the drive ended when quarterback Bill Putich threw an interception.

Week 2: Dartmouth

Michigan rebounded in the second week of the season with a 27-7 win over Dartmouth at Michigan Stadium. Dartmouth scored first with a touchdown pass from Johnny Clayton to John McDonald.  Leo Koceski scored Michigan's first touchdown on 36-yard end run in the first quarter.  Sophomore Lowell Perry caught a 21-yard touchdown pass from Bill Putich near the end of the first half to give Michigan a 13-7 lead at halftime.  Perry also had three interceptions on defense.  Michigan scored two touchdowns in the third quarter, one on a long pass from Don Peterson to Harry Allis.  The final touchdown came after Tony Momsen recovered a blocked punt at the Dartmouth two-yard line.  Fullback Ralph Staffon ran for the touchdown.

Week 3: vs. Army

In the third game of the 1950 season, Michigan faced an Army team that was ranked No. 1 in the AP and Coaches' Polls at Yankee Stadium in New York.  The two teams played to a 6-6 tie at halftime, but Army shut out the Wolverines 21-0 in the second half for a final score of 27-6.  The game marked the 23rd consecutive victory by Army.  Chuck Ortmann threw for 118 yards, and Don Dufek gained 66 yards on the ground and scored Michigan's one touchdown.

Week 4: Wisconsin

In the fourth game of the season, Michigan played Wisconsin in Ann Arbor.  Michigan came into the game unranked with a 1-2 record, while Wisconsin was undefeated and ranked No. 15 in the Coaches' Poll.  Chuck Ortmann ran 16 yards for a touchdown in the first quarter and threw a 29-yard touchdown pass to Bill Putich in the second quarter to give Michigan a 14-0 lead at halftime.  Don Dufek ran one yard for a touchdown in the third quarter.  Dufek scored Michigan's final touchdown after intercepting a pass thrown by Wisconsin quarterback Bob Petruska.  In the fourth quarter, Wisconsin closed the gap, scoring two touchdowns while playing against Michigan's reserves.

Week 5: at Minnesota

In its fifth game, Michigan traveled to Minneapolis to play Minnesota.  After a scoreless first half, Michigan drove down the field culminating in a two-yard run by Don Dufek.  Minnesota tied the game with a touchdown in the final two minutes to tie the game at 7-7.  Dufek rushed for 63 yards, but the Minnesota team held Michigan to a total of only 46 yards rushing as Chuck Ortmann was held to -38 rushing yards.  With the tie game, Michigan retained possession of the Little Brown Jug.

Week 6: Illinois

In the sixth game of the year, Michigan played Illinois in a swirling snowstorm at Michigan Stadium.  The cold temperature and slippery playing surface kept the offensive units of both teams in check.  Chuck Ortmann went 0 for 11 passing, and the Michigan offense was limited to 119 yards of total offense—all gained on the ground.  Because of the inclement weather, the game was reduced to a punting duel between Don Laz of Illinois and Tony Momsen of Michigan.  There were 25 punts in the game, 14 by Michigan and 11 by Illinois.  Near the end of the first half, Illinois put together the only sustained drive of the game.  Starting at its own 20-yard line, Illinois drove 80 yards for the game's only touchdown, converting on a ten-yard pass from Fred Major to Tony Klimek.

Week 7: Indiana

In the seventh game of the season, Michigan defeated Indiana 20-7 at Michigan Stadium.  Michigan scored on the third play of the game when Harry Allis intercepted a pass thrown by Lou D'Achille and returned it 33 yards for a touchdown.  The Wolverines' offense received help from an unexpected source in Wes Bradford, a 155-pound, fifth-string scatback from Troy, Ohio.  Bradford rushed for 105 yards on 15 carries and scored his first career touchdown on a 41-yard run in the second quarter.  Don Dufek scored Michigan's final touchdown on a 54-yard run on the first running play of the second half.

Week 8: Northwestern

In the eighth game of the season, Michigan had its biggest offensive output of the year, defeating Northwestern 34-23 at Michigan Stadium.  Having averaged only 13 points a game in the first seven-game, Michigan scored in touchdowns in all four quarters against the Wildcats.  Michigan's offense was led by a running game that gained 291 net yards, including 110 yards from Don Dufek and 76 yards from Ralph Straffon.  Dufek scored two touchdowns and also intercepted a Dick Flowers' pass.

Week 9: at Ohio State (Snow Bowl)

The 1950 team is probably most remembered for its 9–3 victory over Ohio State in the famous Snow Bowl game played on November 25. The game was played at Ohio Stadium in Columbus in a blizzard, at 10 degrees above zero, on an icy field, and with winds gusting over 30 miles per hour. U-M did not get a first down or complete a pass in the blizzard, punted 24 times, and rushed for only 27 yards, but won 9–3 on a touchdown and a safety, both off blocked punts. Michigan back Don Dufek recalled: "It was very cold.  We kept our hands under our armpits in the huddle. Our center (Carl Kreager) didn't wear any gloves. You couldn't get up a head of steam for anything.  It was bad news, period."

Both Michigan scores came off blocked punts, one resulting in a safety and the other in a touchdown.  All-American "Brick" Wahl was responsible for the safety, blocking a punt by OSU's Heisman Trophy winner Vic Janowicz. The Michigan Daily reported the next day on Wahl's block: "In tallying the safety it was Michigan's captain Al Wahl, who crashed in Janowicz' well-exercised kicking leg. The ball bounced erratically to the right of the onrushing Maize and Blue lineman and was floundering less than a foot outside the end zone border when speedy Al Jackson caught up with it. Six inches closer and the Wolverines could have added six more points."

Rose Bowl: vs. California

The Wolverines then advanced to the Rose Bowl where they beat the previously undefeated California Bears (9–0–1) by a score of 14–6.  Michigan was held scoreless and trailed 6–0 after three quarters, but Dufek took over in the fourth quarter. He ran for 113 yards in the game and scored two touchdowns in the final six minutes of the game. Dufek was named MVP of the game.

Statistical leaders

Scoring

Rushing

Passing

Receiving

Kickoff returns

Punt returns

Starting lineups

Offense

 Left end: Lowell Perry (6 games); Oswald Clark (4 games)  
 Left tackle: Thomas Johnson (6 games); John Hess (4 games)
 Left guard: Peter Kinyon (9 games)
 Center: Carl Kreager (5 games); Jon Padjen (5 games)  
 Right guard: Thomas Kelsey (5 games); Jim Wolter (4 games) 
 Right tackle: Robert Allen "Brick" Wahl (6 games); Ralph Stribe (3 games) 
 Right end: Harry Allis (9 games) 
 Quarterback: Bill Putich (10 games) 
 Fullback: Don Dufek (10 games)  
 Left halfback: Chuck Ortmann (9 games) 
 Right halfback: Leo Koceski (4 games); Don Peterson (2 games); Frank Howll (2 games)

Defense
 Left end: Harry Allis (6 games); Merritt Green (4 games)  
 Left tackle: Thomas Johnson (10 games)  
 Left guard: Dick McWilliams (5 games); Robert Timm (2 games); Thomas Kelsey (1 game); John Powers (1 game); Allen Jackson (1 game)  
 Right guard: Allen Jackson (9 games); Dick McWilliams (1 game)  
 Right tackle: Robert Allen "Brick" Wahl (10 games)  
 Right end: Oswald Clark (9 games); Fred Pickard (1 game)  
 Linebacker: Roger Zatkoff (9 games); Ted Topor (1 game)  
 Linebacker: Tony Momsen (10 games)
 Left halfback: Don Dufek (9 games); Leo Koceski (1 game) 
 Right halfback: Don Peterson (3 games); Don Oldham (2 games); Frank Howell (2 games); Thomas Witherspoon (1); Leo Koceski (2 games) 
 Safety: Chuck Ortmann (7 games); Leo Koceski (3 games); Lowell Perry (1 game)

Awards and honors
 Captain: Robert Allen "Brick" Wahl 
 All-Americans: Robert Allen "Brick" Wahl 
 All-Conference: Robert Allen "Brick" Wahl, Chuck Ortmann, Don Dufek 
 Most Valuable Player: Don Dufek
 Meyer Morton Award: Roger Zatkoff

Coaching staff
Head coach: Bennie Oosterbaan
Assistant coaches: Jack Blott, George Ceithaml, Forrest Jordan, Cliff Keen, Ernest McCoy, Bill Orwig, Don Robinson, Walter Weber, J. T. White
Trainer: Jim Hunt
Manager: William Searle

See also
 1950 in Michigan

References

External links
 1950 Football Team -- Bentley Historical Library, University of Michigan Athletics History

Michigan
Michigan Wolverines football seasons
Big Ten Conference football champion seasons
Rose Bowl champion seasons
Michigan Wolverines football